Anastatus is a large genus of parasitic wasps belonging to the family Eupelmidae.

The genus has cosmopolitan distribution.

Species

Anastatus absonus 
Anastatus acherontiae 
Anastatus adamsi 
Anastatus aereicorpus Girault, 1925
Anastatus alaredactus Narendran, 2009
Anastatus bifasciatus (Geoffroy, 1785)
Anastatus biproruli (Girault, 1925)
Anastatus disparis 
Anastatus dexingtensis Sheng & Wang, 1997 
Anastatus echidna (Motschulsky, 1863)
Anastus flavipes Sheng & Wang, 1997
Anastatus fulloi Sheng & Wang, 1997
Anastatus mantoidae Motschulsky, 1859
Anastatus huangi Sheng & Yu, 1998
Anastatus orientalis Yang and Choi, 2015

References

Eupelmidae
Hymenoptera genera